is a yuri manga series by murata. It was serialized in Young Ace Up! from January 2018 to October 2020, and is licensed and published in English by Yen Press.

Plot
Ayako Takabe, a young woman in her early twenties, intends to leave behind her history as a delinquent leader in high school and reform her image. By chance she encounters her high-school rival, Kirara Soramori. Soramori reveals that she has had a long-standing crush on Takabe, and challenges her to a fight, on the condition that if she wins, she and Takabe will begin dating.

Publication

In August 2021, Yen Press announced that they had licensed the manga for publication in English, under the localized title Catch These Hands. The first volume was released in March 2022.

Volume list

Reception
Writing for Anime News Network, Christopher Farris gave the manga's first volume a positive review, praising the art, story, and humor in contrasting the plot element of the characters' delinquent past with the romantic comedy genre. Azario Lopez, writing for Noisy Pixel, similarly praised the art and story, and the humor drawn from the interactions of its leads, and expressed eagerness for further volumes. Ian Wolf of Anime UK News, by contrast, gave a mixed review, praising the "slapstick" fight scenes and the comedy in Takebe and Soramori's "social misunderstandings," but overall deemed the first volume "not that gripping". Erica Friedman of Ozaku praised the translation and letting of the English release, and the character development of later volumes.

References

2010s LGBT literature
Japanese webcomics
Kadokawa Shoten manga
Seinen manga
Webcomics in print
Yen Press titles
Yuri (genre) anime and manga